Xanthocaecilius sommermanae is a species of insect in the family Paracaeciliidae. It is found in North America.

References

External links

 

Caeciliusidae
Articles created by Qbugbot
Insects described in 1955